Pinnacle Rock State Park is a  day use state park in Mercer County, West Virginia.  The park surrounds  Pinnacle Rock, a sandstone formation that rises above the surrounding terrain.

Features

 Pinnacle Rock
 Jimmy Lewis Lake 
 Large stone picnic shelter
  hiking trail 
 Picnic area
 Fishing

Accessibility

Accessibility for the disabled was assessed by West Virginia University. The 2005 assessment found the  park offices to be accessible.

See also

List of West Virginia state parks

References

External links
 

State parks of West Virginia
Protected areas of Mercer County, West Virginia
Protected areas established in 1938
Landforms of Mercer County, West Virginia
Rock formations of West Virginia
IUCN Category III